Alison Ruth Viktorin (née Retzloff; born February 1, 1981) is an American former voice actress who has worked with Funimation, her most notable role being Conan Edogawa in the detective series Case Closed. She also voiced Kuroko Shirai in A Certain Magical Index and its spinoff, A Certain Scientific Railgun and QT in Space Dandy.

Early life
Alison Ruth Retzloff was born on February 1, 1981, to Sally (née Simonsen) and Albert Retzloff. In 2003, she graduated from California Lutheran University earning a BA in drama. Retzloff married Dustin Kayne Viktorin of Euless, Texas, on August 27, 2005, in Fredericksburg, Texas.

Career
Viktorin has provided voices for English-language versions of many anime dubs, such as the title character Sasami Iwakura in Sasami: Magical Girls Club, Kobato Hasegawa in Haganai series, Kyo Soma in Fruits Basket, Kuroko Shirai in A Certain Magical Index and A Certain Scientific Railgun series, Shelia in Fairy Tail, Shingo Jinnouchi and Ame in the Mamoru Hosoda anime films Summer Wars and Wolf Children, and Gasper Vladi in the High School DxD series.

She has also done commercials and modeling in the Dallas/Fort Worth area.

In video games, she voiced Jing Wei, a playable God in Smite.

In 2021, Viktorin announced that she would be retiring from anime voice acting in light of political disagreements on social media during the U.S. Capitol attack, as well as the difficulty of recording from home during the COVID-19 pandemic.

Filmography

Anime

Video games

Live-action dubbing

References

External links
 Official agency profile
 
 Alison Viktorin at the CrystalAcids Anime Voice Actor Database
 

1981 births
21st-century American actresses
American voice actresses
Actresses from California
Actresses from Houston
California Lutheran University alumni
Living people
People from Euless, Texas
People from Thousand Oaks, California